Otto Adam Neu (September 24, 1894 – September 19, 1932) was a shortstop who played briefly in Major League Baseball during the 1917 season. He was born in Springfield, Ohio.

Neu was a major leaguer whose career, statistically speaking, was similar to that of Moonlight Graham. Previously, he had played minor league baseball for the Senators, Indians and Browns organizations, and made his majors debut on July 10, 1917 with the Browns, appearing for them in a game against the Yankees at Sportsman's Park.

But Neu did not have a fielding chance or turn at-bat, and never appeared in a major league game again. Following his playing retirement he worked as a salesman.

Neu died of intestinal influenza in Kenton, Ohio, five days short of his 38th birthday.

Legacy 
The fantasy baseball platform Ottoneu derives its name from Otto Neu.

Sources

1917 St. Louis Browns
The Deadball Era

References

St. Louis Browns players
Major League Baseball shortstops
Baseball players from Ohio
Sportspeople from Springfield, Ohio
1894 births
1932 deaths